Jackson Township is the name of nine townships in Kansas:

 Jackson Township, Anderson County, Kansas
 Jackson Township, Edwards County, Kansas
 Jackson Township, Geary County, Kansas
 Jackson Township, Jewell County, Kansas
 Jackson Township, Lyon County, Kansas
 Jackson Township, McPherson County, Kansas
 Jackson Township, Osborne County, Kansas
 Jackson Township, Riley County, Kansas
 Jackson Township, Sumner County, Kansas

See also 
 Jackson Township (disambiguation)

Kansas township disambiguation pages